King's College Bridge is the eighth river Cam bridge overall and the fourth bridge on its middle upstream in Cambridge. In the 15th century there was built the first wooden bridge, the current stone structure designed famous British architect William Wilkins in 1818 and it was constructed by Francis Braidwood in 1819.

See also
List of bridges in Cambridge
Template:River Cam map

References

Bridges in Cambridge
Bridges across the River Cam
Pedestrian bridges in England
Arch bridges in England
King's College, Cambridge